The 2022/23 NTFL season was the 102nd season of the Northern Territory Football League (NTFL). 

This season had introduced the newest club for the Men's Premier League, PINT Greenants. In doing so, this season from then a now on has nine clubs playing in the comp.

References 

Northern Territory Football League seasons
NTFL